Yendovsky is a rural locality (a khutor) in Samolshinskoye Rural Settlement, Alexeyevsky District, Volgograd Oblast, Russia. The population was 10 as of 2010.

Geography 
Yendovsky is located on the right bank of the Khopyor River, 22 km northwest of Alexeyevskaya (the district's administrative centre) by road. Tishanskaya is the nearest rural locality.

References 

Rural localities in Alexeyevsky District, Volgograd Oblast